Heleodromia immaculata  is a species of fly in the family Empididae. It is found in the  Palearctic .

References

External links
Images representing Heleodromia immaculata  at BOLD

Insects described in 1833
Asilomorph flies of Europe
Empididae